The Miller’s Reach Fire, also known as the Big Lake Fire, was a wildfire that began on June 2, 1996 in an area around Miller’s Reach Road near Houston, Alaska, approximately  north of Anchorage, Alaska. The fire was at the time the most destructive in Alaska history, consuming more structures than all other wildfires in Alaskan history combined. 37 fire departments and 1,800 firefighting and support personnel responded to the fire. It took nearly two weeks to completely control the fire.

Circumstances before the fire 
Boreal forest predominates in the area, composed mostly of black spruce, with some birch, alder, white spruce, and cottonwood. A very thick undergrowth was present at the time of the fire.

A drought began in the area in September of 1995, some nine months before the fire. During the winter of 1995/1996, the area received less than 30% of its normal precipitation. With the ground frozen so deep, the spring thaw of accumulated snow ran off into streams in the area rather than being subsumed into the ground. Drought conditions with humidities lower than 25% persisted in the region prior to the inception of the fire.

Evolution of the fire 
Around 4:00 p.m. local time on June 2, a fire began in the Miller's Reach Road area. A few hot spots remained, which were expected to be resolved by the next day.

On June 3, the weather during the day consisted of light winds out of the southwest, fair skies, and moderate humidity. The fire reignited and spread out of control. As a result of the sustained drought, the predominant black spruce were drier than normal and became the primary fuel for the fire. This resulted in a crown fire. Within four hours, the fire had spread south . The Alaska Division of Forestry incident commander called for an evacuation of neighborhoods in the Big Lake area. Many people defied the evacuation order, including Iditarod Trail Sled Dog Race champion Martin Buser. By the evening,  were involved in the fire.

On the morning of June 4, a red flag warning was issued by the Anchorage Weather Service Forecast Office, due to high winds, high temperatures, and low humidity. The fire continued to rapidly spread through the canopy of the forest. The fire reached the northeast shore of Big Lake by the afternoon. The fire had burned . The initial command and control center was placed at Houston High School, about three miles southeast of the ignition point of the fire. As the fire and the response from local, state and federal authorities grew, a unified command structure was established at Creekside Plaza in Wasilla, Alaska, about 12 miles further east. Governor Tony Knowles issued a State Disaster Declaration. 

By June 5, the fire had spread west along the north shore and south along the east shore of Big Lake. Smoke rose as high as  into the sky.

By June 7, reports indicated the fire was slowing down. On June 8, President Clinton signed Federal Disaster Declaration AK-1119-DR, making federal disaster relief funding available. This funding eventually exceeded $8 million. On June 10, the fire was declared to be contained. On June 15, the fire was declared to be under control.

Aftermath 
The Big Lake, Alaska area suffered significant and sustained economic loss. Rail and road transportation between Anchorage and Fairbanks was temporarily cut off. Following the fire, funds exceeding $1.5 million were made available for wildfire mitigation measures.

In 1998, a class action lawsuit seeking approximately $100 million in damages was brought against the State of Alaska alleging the state mismanaged the fire. In 2003, a unanimous jury ruled in favor of the state.

References

Sources 

1996 in Alaska
1996 natural disasters in the United States
1990s wildfires in the United States
Wildfires in Alaska
History of Matanuska-Susitna Borough, Alaska
1996 fires in the United States